Newport is on Farm to Market Road 1288 and SH 59  southeast of Henrietta in far southeastern Clay County, Texas. Farm to Market Road 2127 also passes just south of town.  Its population is estimated at 70.

History
The town was initially established by L. Hancock in 1872 as Bear Hill. It received a post office in 1878, and in 1879, the name of the town and post office was changed to Newport. The town is far from any navigable water and never was a port of any kind; the name derives from the initials of seven founding families: Norman, Ezell, Welch, Pruitt, Owsley, Reiger, and Turner. Another possibility of the town's name is that the town's location lies within the original land grant to Connell O'Donell Kelly, a Texas patriot who fought in the Battle of San Jacinto.  Mr. Kelly was born in Newport, Ireland.

A three classroom school was constructed in Newport, Texas during the Great Depression with the assistance of funds from the Works Progress Administration.

By 1900 Newport's population reached 176. It increased to 280 by the mid-1920s and stayed at that level through the 1940s. By the 1950s the population had dropped to 85. From the 1960s through today, the population of Newport was 70. Townspeople of Newport have long associated more closely with Jacksboro and Jack County than either Henrietta or Clay County, though the town is actually closer to Bowie in Montague County.  Its post office remained open until the early 1990s.

Notable people
John C. White,  served more than twenty-six years as the elected commissioner of the Texas Department of Agriculture. White was the chairman of the Democratic National Committee from 1978 to 1981.

References

Towns in Texas
Geography of Clay County, Texas
Ghost towns in North Texas